Lankascincus dorsicatenatus, also known as the catenated lankaskink, is a species of skink, a lizard in the family Scincidae. The species is endemic to island of Sri Lanka.

Taxonomy
L. dorsicatenus was originally placed in the “wastebasket taxon” Sphenomorphus, but was later moved to the genus Lankascincus, which is a genus of skinks endemic to Sri Lanka.

Geographic range
L. dorsicatenatus is found in southwestern Sri Lanka, the wet zone.

Habitat
The preferred natural habitat of L. dorsicatenatus is forest.

Reproduction
L. dorsicatenatus is oviparous. Clutch size is one egg.

References

Further reading
Deraniyagala PEP (1953). A Coloured Atlas of Some Vertebrates from Ceylon. Volume 2. Tetrapod Reptilia. Colombo: Government Press. 101 pp. (Sphenomorphus dorsicatenatus, new species). 
Greer AE (1991). "Lankascincus, a New Genus of Scincid Lizards from Sri Lanka, with Descriptions of Three New Species". Journal of Herpetology 25 (1): 59–64.

External links
Wickramasinghe LJM, Rodrigo R, Dayawansa N, Jayantha ULD (2007). "Two new species of Lankascincus (Squamata: Scincidae) from Sripada Sanctuary (Peak Wilderness), in Sri Lanka" Zootaxa 1612: 1–24.

Lankascincus
Reptiles of Sri Lanka
Endemic fauna of Sri Lanka
Reptiles described in 1953
Taxa named by Paulus Edward Pieris Deraniyagala